Julius A. Roth (1924 – 2002) was Professor of Sociology at University of California, Davis. He is best known for his 1963 groundbreaking work in medical sociology, Timetables: Structuring the Passage of Time in Hospital Treatment and Other Careers, based in part on his own experience as a tuberculosis (TB) patient. Excerpts from Timetables were included in the Penguin Modern Sociology Readings anthology Rules and Meanings (1973).

Roth is sometimes associated with the so-called "Second" Chicago School of Sociology, although his University of Chicago degrees (M.A., 1950; Ph.D., 1954) were both awarded through the Committee on Human Development. Roth describes how his mentors Everett Hughes and David Riesman encouraged him to keep a journal during his TB hospitalizations, which eventually led to the publication of Timetables.

References

1924 births
2002 deaths
Medical sociologists
American sociologists
University of California, Davis faculty
University of Chicago alumni
Tuberculosis researchers